Anthony Bonvisi (1470s–1558) was an Italian emigrant to England. He was a merchant who improved spinning methods in Devon. He was also a correspondent of St. Thomas More.

References 

1470s births
Italian emigrants to the Kingdom of England
1558 deaths